Alex M. Molden (born August 4, 1973) is a former American football defensive back who was drafted 11th in the 1996 NFL Draft by the New Orleans Saints.  He played defensive back between 1996 and 2004 for the New Orleans Saints, the San Diego Chargers and the Detroit Lions.

College career
Molden played college football at the University of Oregon and was on the team that reached the 1995 Rose Bowl. He was redshirted in 1991. In 1992 he had 55 tackles, four interceptions, and 19 passes broken up. He suffered a devastating knee injury in the Independence Bowl, and tore his anterior cruciate, medial collateral and posterior cruciate ligaments. He came back after a nine-month rehabilitation to start nine games in 1993. He was selected as an All-Pacific 10 cornerback in 1994, and was an All-Pacific 10/Football Coaches Association All-American and Associated Press second-team All-American in 1995.

Professional career

Personal life 

Alex Molden and his wife, Christin, have eight children. His son Elijah played college football at Washington and was drafted by the Tennessee Titans in the 3rd round of the 2021 NFL Draft. Currently, Molden is a motivational speaker located in Portland.

References
 

1973 births
Living people
Musicians from Detroit
American football cornerbacks
Oregon Ducks football players
San Diego Chargers players
New Orleans Saints players
Detroit Lions players